NSVL may refer to: 
North Sea Volunteer Lifeguards, an English volunteer lifeguard club